Nationality words link to articles with information on the nation's poetry or literature (for instance, Irish or France).

Works published

United Kingdom
 Samuel Taylor Coleridge, Poetical Works, including "On Quitting School" (last edition proofread by the author, who died this year)
 Sara Coleridge, Pretty Lessons in Verse for Good Children
 George Crabbe, The Poetical Works of George Crabbe (includes letters, journals and a biography by Crabbe's son; published in eight volumes from February through September)
 Thomas De Quincey, Recollections of the Lake Poets, beginning this year, a series of essays published in Tait's Edinburgh Magazine on the Lake Poets, including William Wordsworth and Robert Southey ; this year, essays on Samuel Taylor Coleridge were published from September through November, with another in January 1835 (see also Recollections 1839; last essay in the series was published in 1840)
 Charlotte Elliott, editor, The Invalid's Hymn Book (anthology)
 A. H. Hallam, Remains in Verse and Prose, posthumously published, including a memoir by Henry Hallam
 R. S. Hawker, Records of the Western Shore
 Felicia Dorothea Hemans:
 National Lyrics, and Songs for Music
 Scenes and Hymns of Life
 Mary Howitt, The Seven Temptations
 Richard Monckton Milnes, Memorials of a Tour in Some Parts of Greece, Chiefly Poetical
 Thomas Moore, Irish Melodies
 Amelia Opie, Lays for the Dead
 Thomas Pringle, African Sketches
 Catherine Eliza Richardson Poems: Second Series
 Samuel Rogers, Poems
 Percy Bysshe Shelley, The Works of Percy Bysshe Shelley, with the Life, unauthorized; parts were reissued this year as Posthumous Poems
 Henry Taylor, Philip van Artevelde
 Alfred Tennyson, "Morte d'Arthur", completed by October but not published until Poems 1842
 Letitia Elizabeth Landon, writing under the pen name "L.E.L." Fisher's Drawing Room Scrap Book, 1835, including the Fairy of the Fountains

Other
 Thomas Holley Chivers, Conrad and Eudora; or, the Death of Alonzo, United States
 Frederik Paludan-Muller, Amor og Psyche ("Cupid and Psyche"), a verse drama, Denmark
 Adam Mickiewicz, Pan Tadeusz, czyli ostatni zajazd na Litwie. Historia szlachecka z roku 1811 i 1812 we dwunastu księgach wierszem pisana ("Mister Thaddeus, or the Last Foray in Lithuania: a History of the Nobility in the Years 1811 and 1812 in Twelve Books of Verse"), also known simply as "Pan Tadeusz", an epic poem in Polish, published in June in Paris
 France Prešeren, Sonnets of Unhappiness

Births
Death years link to the corresponding "[year] in poetry" article:
 7 February – Estanislao del Campo (died 1880), Argentine poet
 24 March – William Morris (died 1896), English poet and designer
 27 March – Melissa Elizabeth Riddle Banta (died 1907), American poet
 5 May – Emily Rebecca Page (died 1862), American poet and editor
 24 June – George Arnold (died 1865), American author and poet
 9 July – Jan Neruda (died 1891), Czech writer
 27 August – Roden Noel (died 1894), English poet
 1 October – Mary Mackellar, née Cameron (died 1890), Scottish Gaelic poet and translator
 2 November – Harriet McEwen Kimball (died 1917), American poet, hymnwriter, philanthropist
 10 November – José Hernández (died 1886), Argentine poet
 23 November – James Thomson (died 1882), Scottish poet publishing under the pen name "Bysshe Vanolis"

Deaths

Birth years link to the corresponding "[year] in poetry" article:
 17 February – John Thelwall (born 1764), radical English orator, writer, elocutionist and poet
 23 February – Karl Ludwig von Knebel (born 1744), German poet and translator
 25 July – Samuel Taylor Coleridge, English Romantic poet, critic and writer
 5 December – Thomas Pringle (born 1789), Scottish writer, poet and abolitionist
 27 December – Charles Lamb, English, poet, playwright, critic and essayist

See also

 19th century in literature
 19th century in poetry
 Golden Age of Russian Poetry (1800–1850)
 List of poetry awards
 List of poets
 List of years in poetry
 List of years in literature
 Poetry
 Young Germany (Junges Deutschland) a loose group of German writers from about 1830 to 1850

Notes

19th-century poetry
Poetry